Kartsevo is a rural locality (a village) in Markovskoye Rural Settlement, Vologodsky District, Vologda Oblast, Russia. The population was 14 as of 2002.

Geography 
Kartsevo is located 29 km southeast of Vologda (the district's administrative centre) by road. Kalinkino is the nearest rural locality.

References 

Rural localities in Vologodsky District